KFAV (99.9 FM) is a commercial radio station located in Warrenton, Missouri, broadcasting to the western suburbs (the Westplex) of the Saint Louis, Missouri, area.  KFAV airs a country music format, like its sister station on the AM dial, KWRE.

In 2007, and in 2014,  KFAV program director Mike Thomas was recognized by New Music Weekly magazine as the Country Program Director of the Year at the New Music Awards. The Station itself was also recognized as "Country Radio Station of the Year" by the Magazine in 2014.

History of KFAV FM:  In November 1991, radio station owners of Kaspar Broadcasting, Vernon John Kaspar and Steven Charles Kaspar put a new radio station on the air to service the west metro area of St. Louis...99.9 FM KFAV (All Hit V100). In September 1991, preparing to put the station on the air (went on the air in early November, 1991) a decision was made to name St. Charles, Lincoln, Warren, and Franklin Counties "The Westplex"...as the Dallas, Tx. area towards Fort Worth is called "the Metroplex

References

External links
KFAV facebook
KFAV official website

FAV
Country radio stations in the United States
Radio stations established in 1991
1991 establishments in Missouri